Quintinia serrata, the tawheowheo, is a species of evergreen trees in the genus Quintinia endemic to New Zealand.

This plant has different patterns of anthocyanins (cyanidin 3-O-glucoside and cyanidin 3-O-galactoside) in its leaves to protect the shade-adapted chloroplasts from direct sun light.

References

External links
 
 

Paracryphiales
Plants described in 1839
Endemic flora of New Zealand
Trees of New Zealand